Workers' Party of Turkey (Türkiye İşçi Partisi) was a Turkish political party, founded the 13 February 1961. It became the first socialist party in Turkey to win representation in the national parliament. It was banned twice (after the military coups of 1971 and 1980) and eventually merged with the Communist Party of Turkey in 1987.

History
TİP was founded by a group of labour union members. The founders invited lawyer Mehmet Ali Aybar to assume the leadership of the party. Following Aybar, several intellectuals like Çetin Altan, Aziz Nesin and Yaşar Kemal also joined the ranks and the party soon adopted a left-wing nationalist and socialist program.

The party's breakthrough came in the 1965 general election when it got 3% of the votes in the national elections and won 15 seats in the parliament. TİP deputies' highly publicized active participation in parliamentary sessions contributed to a radicalisation of the political scene in the country. By 1967-68, militant left-wing student organizations and labour unions were formed.

In 1968, after the Soviet invasion of Czechoslovakia, Aybar adopted a rhetoric hostile to Soviet Communism. However, when TİP failed to increase its votes in the 1969 general election, Aybar resigned from the party leadership in November 1969 and Behice Boran, who had opposed Aybar's anti-Soviet stand, was elected as the first female Turkish party leader. The party was a supporter of the pro-Kurdish Revolutionary Cultural Eastern Hearths (DDKO). During its Party Congress in October 1970, it recognized existence of the Kurdish community in eastern part of the country which had to affront policies of forced assimilation.

After the military coup of 1971 the party criticized the government and supported strikes against the military coup. The government subsequently accused the TİP supporting the separation of the unity of Turkey, and for  viewing the Kurds as a different ethnicity. A lawsuit was started on the 26 July 1971, the party banned in 1972. Boran and other senior TİP leaders, were arrested and sentenced between 12 to 15 years,  imprisonment, the TİP delegates to 8 years. They were released following an amnesty in 1974 and re-established TİP the next year. But the party could not regain its popularity. In 1978 the Bahçelievler massacre saw seven student members of the TİP killed in Ankara by ultranationalists.

TİP was once again banned after the military coup in 1980. This time, Boran went to exile in Europe and the party continued to operate clandestinely. In 1987, it merged with the Communist Party of Turkey to form the United Communist Party of Turkey in Brussels.

Notable politicians

See also
Workers' Party (Turkey)
Workers' Party of Turkey (2017)
June 15-16 events (Turkey)

References

1961 establishments in Turkey
1987 disestablishments in Turkey
Banned communist parties
Banned political parties in Turkey
Defunct communist parties in Turkey
Political parties established in 1961
Political parties disestablished in 1987